Frontier Circus is an American Western television series about a traveling circus roaming the American West in the 1880s. Filmed by Revue Productions, the program originally aired on CBS from October 5, 1961, until September 6, 1962.

Overview
The show featured such veteran Western television and film performers as Chill Wills as "Colonel Kasey Thompson," John Derek as "Ben Travis," Richard Jaeckel as "Scout Tony Gentry," and J. Pat O'Malley as "Duffy". Characters Thompson and Travis were the owners of the Thompson/Travis traveling circus.

Cast
Chill Wills as Colonel Kasey Thompson
John Derek as Ben Travis
Richard Jaeckel as Scout Tony Gentry

Guest stars

Claude Akins
Chris Alcaide
John Anderson
Edward Andrews
R. G. Armstrong
Eddie Albert
Parley Baer
Roy Barcroft
Don "Red" Barry
Patricia Barry
Lane Bradford
Kathie Browne
Red Buttons
Harry Carey Jr.
Paul Carr
Iron Eyes Cody
John Considine
Richard Conte
Ellen Corby
Alex Cord
Lloyd Corrigan
Royal Dano
Sammy Davis Jr.
Frank DeKova
Irene Dunne
Dan Duryea
Jena Engstrom
Jason Evers
Frank Ferguson
William Fawcett
Constance Ford
James Gregory
Don Haggerty
Alan Hale Jr.
Anne Helm
Skip Homeier
Clegg Hoyt
Arte Johnson
Carolyn Jones
Henry Jones
Brian Keith
Adam Kennedy
Otto Kruger
Cloris Leachman
Bethel Leslie
George Macready
Howard McNear
Vera Miles
Roger Mobley
Elizabeth Montgomery
Jeanette Nolan
Nehemiah Persoff
William Phipps
John Pickard
Joe Ploski
Mike Ragan
Thelma Ritter
Gilbert Roland
Mickey Rooney
Charles Ruggles
Barbara Rush
Walter Sande
Vito Scotti
Jay Silverheels
Robert F. Simon
Joan Staley
Stella Stevens
Barbara Stuart
Gloria Talbott
Kenneth Tobey
Rip Torn
Jo Van Fleet
Robert J. Wilke
H. M. Wynant
Chief Yowlachie
Dick York

Episodes

Reception

Frontier Circus ran opposite two ABC sitcoms, The Adventures of Ozzie and Harriet and The Donna Reed Show and another western series, The Outlaws on NBC, starring Barton MacLane and Don Collier. The difference between its plot and the plot of most standard Westerns may have led to its short run.

Home media
Timeless Media Group released the complete series on DVD in Region 1 on April 20, 2010.

References

 McNeil, Alex. Total Television  (1996). New York: Penguin Books 
 Brooks, Tim and Marsh, Earle, The Complete Directory to Prime Time Network and Cable TV Shows(1999). New York: Ballantine Books

External links
 

1961 American television series debuts
1962 American television series endings
Television series set in the 1880s
Black-and-white American television shows
CBS original programming
Circus television shows
English-language television shows
1960s Western (genre) television series
Television series by Universal Television